A three-way hybrid set-top box is a hybrid device typically used by Pay TV operators and Telecommunications service providers to converge content delivered via three different video transport networks – satellite, terrestrial and IP [managed or public Internet].  Three-way Hybrid [or tribrid] Set-Top Boxes enable consumers to navigate between a wide range of content quickly and intuitively, and view it all on the main household TV set.

One of the first operators to deploy a tribrid platform is ITI Neovision's n in Poland, which rolled out their Turbo Dekoder HD in December 2009 using Advanced Digital Broadcast's ADB-5720SX.  The n deployment won the 2010 IP TV World Forum award for Best Interactive TV service and "best in show" awards.

References 

 http://media2.pl/media/62667-iptv-world-series-award-dla-turbodekodera-hd.html
 http://www.rapidtvnews.com/index.php/201003246193/adb-wins-iptv-world-award.html
 http://n.pl/news/show/1291-iptv_world_series_award_dla_turbodekodera_hd_z_cyfrowa_nagrywarka_telewizji_n.html

Cable television technology
Consumer electronics
Satellite television
Set-top box